John Mwebi (born 18 January 1950) is a Kenyan sprinter. He competed in the men's 100 metres at the 1972 Summer Olympics. He won a silver medal in the 100 metres at the 1974 British Commonwealth Games. Mwebi also won bronze medals in the 100 and 200 metres at the 1973 All-Africa Games.

References

1950 births
Living people
Athletes (track and field) at the 1972 Summer Olympics
Kenyan male sprinters
Olympic athletes of Kenya
Athletes (track and field) at the 1974 British Commonwealth Games
Athletes (track and field) at the 1978 Commonwealth Games
Commonwealth Games silver medallists for Kenya
Commonwealth Games medallists in athletics
African Games bronze medalists for Kenya
African Games medalists in athletics (track and field)
Place of birth missing (living people)
Athletes (track and field) at the 1973 All-Africa Games
20th-century Kenyan people
Medallists at the 1974 British Commonwealth Games